Brombach is a river of Bavaria, Germany.

It is a left tributary of the Swabian Rezat near Pleinfeld. It flows through the 3.56-hectare nature reserve of Brombachmoor and through the Großer Brombachsee reservoir.

See also
List of rivers of Bavaria

References 

Rivers of Bavaria
Weißenburg-Gunzenhausen
Rivers of Germany